Fiji Love is a 2014 Chinese romantic comedy film directed by Tao Sheng. It was released on November 21, 2014.

Cast
Jang Woo-hyuk
Yao Xingtong  
Li Mao
He Zhuoyan
Zhao Duo-na 
Jin Cao
Chen Tianwen
Liu Zihao

Reception

Box office
By November 25, 2014, the film had earned ¥0.89 million at the Chinese box office.

References

2014 romantic comedy films
Chinese romantic comedy films